Peter A Line is a former English international lawn and indoor bowler.

Bowls career

World Championships
Line won the fours gold medal with Norman King, Cliff Stroud and Ted Hayward at the 1972 World Outdoor Bowls Championship in Worthing. Four years later he won two more medals; a bronze medal in the fours with John C Evans, Bill Irish and Tommy Armstrong and a silver medal in the team event (Leonard Cup).

Commonwealth Games
Line won the gold medal in the pairs with Norman King during the 1970 British Commonwealth Games and four years later won a silver medal with John Evans in the 1974 British Commonwealth Games.

National
Line bowled for the Atherley Club and Banister Park in Southampton, Hampshire, and won the national singles title in 1961 and 1964.

He first played for England in 1955.

Personal life
He is married to a fellow England international, Wendy Line. and by trade he was a civil service cartographical draughtsman and joined the Banister Park Bowls Club in 1948.

References

English male bowls players
1930 births
Living people
Bowls World Champions
Commonwealth Games medallists in lawn bowls
Commonwealth Games gold medallists for England
Commonwealth Games silver medallists for England
Bowls players at the 1970 British Commonwealth Games
Bowls players at the 1974 British Commonwealth Games
Medallists at the 1970 British Commonwealth Games
Medallists at the 1974 British Commonwealth Games